Euenkrates elegans is a species of earwigs in the family Chelisochidae. It is found in Sumatra and 
Java.

References

External links 

 Euenkrates elegans at dermaptera.speciesfile.org
 Chelisochidae at bug.tamu.edu

Chelisochidae
Insects described in 1900